Hypericum glandulosum is a perennial herb in the genus Hypericum, in the section Adenosepalum, subsect. Aethiopicum.

Medicinal Uses of Hypericum glandulosum 
According to a study done on the effects of Hypericum glandulosum on mice, the findings have revealed that the aerial component of Hypericum glandulosum in bloom has topical anti-inflammatory, analgesic activities, and anti-depressant properties, suggesting a potential for local medicinal uses in inflammatory illnesses. Because of showing promise as a treatment for cancer, inflammation, bacterial and viral infections, and other conditions, hypericum glandulosum has gained popularity as a mainstream complementary medicine for treating depression.

References

glandulosum